Wilfred John Raymond Haskell (born 12 December 1936) is a former cricketer and schoolteacher in New Zealand. He is now a sports historian.

Life and career
Wilf Haskell was born in Karachi, where his father was a missionary and schoolteacher. In the 1940s the family moved to Nelson, where Wilf attended Nelson College.

An accurate medium-fast bowler, Haskell made his first-class cricket debut for Wellington in 1955-56, but did not establish himself in the team until 1967-68. In the first match of the 1967-68 season, against Otago, he took 6 for 6 off 16 overs to dismiss Otago for 85 in the second innings and give Wellington victory by 149 runs.

He became a schoolteacher, teaching at a number of schools in New Zealand, and finally, from 1980 to 1998, at Wellington College. Since he retired from teaching he has written sports history.

Books
Seasons of Honour: A Centenary History of New Zealand Hockey 1902–2002 (2002) (with Geoff Watson)
Faster Stronger Higher: Golden Olympians of New Zealand: Volume I: 1912–1968 (2011)

References

External links

1936 births
Living people
Indian emigrants to New Zealand
New Zealand cricketers
Wellington cricketers
New Zealand male field hockey players
Cricketers from Karachi
New Zealand sports historians
New Zealand schoolteachers
People educated at Nelson College